Diadegma dinianator is a wasp first described by Aubert in 1966.
No subspecies are listed.

References

dinianator
Insects described in 1966